Bethel Presbyterian Church is a historic Presbyterian church near Clover, South Carolina.

History 
It was founded in 1764 and is the oldest church in York County, which was still considered part of North Carolina in 1764. Bethel is one of the oldest churches in the region, and is the mother church of many neighboring congregations. The church was established by Rev. William Richardson, minister of the Old Waxhaw Presbyterian Church in Lancaster County, South Carolina, to service the burgeoning population on the west side of the Catawba River.

Colonel Samuel Watson was an influential member of Bethel, as well as highly respected in the community. When talk of rebellion became general, Watson quickly rose to the cause. Watson was elected to the South Carolina Provincial Congress of 1775-1776 and participated in the framing of South Carolina's first written constitution. Colonel Watson was the grandfather of Rev. Samuel Lytle Watson, Pastor of Bethel Presbyterian Church for 42 years.

Bethel Church was incorporated by the Legislature of South Carolina, March 22, 1786, with the title, "The Presbyterian Church of Bethel Congregation".
Bethel become part of the Southern Presbyterian Church.

The present church building, the fourth house of worship, was erected in 1873.

52 Revolutionary War soldiers buried in its historic cemetery. Among them is Thomas Neel, a War of Independence hero and a founding elder of the church. Many Confederate soldiers are buried there as well.

On July 1, 1973, Bethel Presbyterian Church voted unanimously to withdraw from the Presbyterian Church US (PCUS) and join a new group of believers, the Presbyterian Church in America (PCA).

In 2014 the church celebrated its 250 anniversary.

Architecture 
The current church building was constructed in 1873, immediately adjacent to the earlier church, which was torn down. The current structure was added to the National Register of Historic Places in 1980.
The church, a local interpretation of a colonial meeting house.  The heavy post and beam, hand-hewn, wooden pegged construction is unusual for so late in the century, especially when lighter, more rapid assembled methods were in common use. The king post truss used in Bethel's roof structure is an ancient design found in some of America's earliest churches. Bethel represents an architectural achievement during a time of political and social upheaval and economic adversity that marked the Reconstruction era. Bethel's congregation constructed a commodious house of worship under severely reduced circumstances, doing so without incurring debt. A large well-tended cemetery covers three acres of a ridge on the property's east side. Enclosed by a stone wall, it contained some three to four thousand graves in 1887. _ Adopted from the South Carolina Department of Archives and History
National Register Properties in South Carolina

List of Pastors 

Rev. Hezekiah Balch	 1770-1776
Rev. Francis Cummins	 1782-1789
Rev. George G. McWhorter	 1796-1801
Rev. James S. Adams (Stated Supply)	 1811-1840
Rev. Samuel L. Watson	 1840-1882
Rev. Robert A. Webb	 1882-1887
Rev. G.S. Robinson	 1888-1890
Rev. David S. McAllister	 1891-1899
Rev. William B. Arrowood	 1899-1909
Rev. Robert Adams	 1910-1914
Rev. R.K. Timmons	 1914-1916
Rev. George W. Nickell	 1917-1924
Rev. A.H. Key	 1925-1933
Dr. Tilden Scherer (Temporary Supply)	 1934-1937
Dr. Tilden Scherer	 1937-1950
Rev. David Coblentz	 1951-1961
Rev. Kenneth L. Newman	 1962-1966
Rev. James L. Moss	 1967-1971
Rev. Vernon N. West	 1972-1986
Rev. John A. Gess	 1986–2015
Rev. J. Marcus Van Vlake	 2015–Present

External links 
Bethel Church website

References

Presbyterian churches in South Carolina
Churches on the National Register of Historic Places in South Carolina
Churches completed in 1873
19th-century Presbyterian church buildings in the United States
National Register of Historic Places in York County, South Carolina
Churches in York County, South Carolina